Nikki Randall may refer to:

 Nikki Randall (actress) (born 1964), pornographic actress
 Nikki Randall (politician) (born 1972), Democratic member of the Georgia House of Representatives

de:Nikki Randall